Rogovići may refer to:

 Rogovići, Kaštelir-Labinci, a village in the Kaštelir-Labinci municipality, Istria, Croatia
 Rogovići (Pazin), a former hamlet now part of Pazin, Istria, Croatia